Janez Leo "John" Jakopin (born May 16, 1975) is a Canadian former professional ice hockey defenceman who played in the National Hockey League (NHL) for the Florida Panthers, Pittsburgh Penguins and the San Jose Sharks between 1998 and 2002.

Career
Jakopin was born in Toronto, Ontario. As a youth, he played in the 1989 Quebec International Pee-Wee Hockey Tournament with the Toronto Marlboros minor ice hockey team. He was drafted 97th overall by the Detroit Red Wings in the 1993 NHL Entry Draft and played a total of 113 regular season games, scoring one goal and six assists for seven points, collecting 145 penalty minutes. He spent most of his career bouncing around the league, playing mostly in the American Hockey League.  He retired in 2005 after a spell with HDD Olimpija Ljubljana in Slovenia.

Career statistics

Regular season and playoffs

Awards and honors

References

External links

1975 births
Living people
Adirondack Red Wings players
Binghamton Senators players
Canadian expatriate ice hockey players in Slovenia
Canadian ice hockey defencemen
Canadian people of Slovenian descent
Detroit Red Wings draft picks
Florida Panthers players
Hartford Wolf Pack players
HDD Olimpija Ljubljana players
Louisville Panthers players
Merrimack Warriors men's ice hockey players
Pittsburgh Penguins players
San Jose Sharks players
Ice hockey people from Toronto
Wilkes-Barre/Scranton Penguins players